Willunga may refer to:

Willunga, South Australia, a locality
Willunga Football Club, an Australian rules football club in South Australia
Willunga High School, a high school in South Australia
Willunga railway line, a former railway line in South Australia
Willunga railway station, a former railway station in South Australia
District Council of Willunga, a former local government area in South Australia
Hundred of Willunga, a cadastral unit in South Australia

See also
Port Willunga, South Australia
Willunga South, South Australia
Willungacetus